The men's tandem at the 1960 Summer Olympics in Rome, Italy was held from 26 to 27 August 1960. There were 24 participants from 12 nations.

Competition format

Tandem cycling features a series of one-on-one, head-to-head races between teams. The 1960 Olympic competition included six rounds: heats, a two-round repechage, quarterfinals, semifinals, and finals.

 Heats: Because there were 14 teams entered, 7 heats were scheduled. The heats were not adjusted after 2 teams withdrew, essentially providing the teams in those heats with a bye. Otherwise, the winner of each heat advanced to the quarterfinals; the loser was relegated to the repechage.
 Repechage: There was a two-round repechage. One of the 5 teams that had lost in the heats did not contest the repechage. The remaining 4 teams paired off into two heats; the winner of each advanced to the repechage final while the loser was eliminated. The repechage final allowed the winner to advance to the quarterfinals; the loser was eliminated.
 Quarterfinals: Beginning with the quarterfinals, each match was best-of-three races. There were 4 quarterfinals contested by the 7 heat winners and 1 repechage winner. The winner of each quarterfinal advanced to the semifinals.
 Semifinals: The winner of each semifinal advanced to the gold medal final. The loser of each was scheduled to compete in a bronze medal final, though this was cancelled due to an injury withdrawal.
 Finals: A gold medal final and a bronze medal final were scheduled, but only the gold medal final was held.

Results

Heats

Heat 1

Heat 2

Heat 3

Heat 4

Heat 5

Heat 6

Heat 7

Repechage heats

Repechage heat 1

Repechage heat 2

Repechage final

Quarterfinals

Quarterfinal 1

Quarterfinal 2

Quarterfinal 3

Quarterfinal 4

Semifinals

Semifinal 1

The Dutch team crashed during the second race and were unable to continue the contest.

Semifinal 2

Finals

Bronze medal final

The Dutch team did not start the bronze medal final after crashing during the semifinals.

Gold medal final

Final classification

References

Cycling at the 1960 Summer Olympics
Cycling at the Summer Olympics – Men's tandem
Track cycling at the 1960 Summer Olympics